Polythora is a genus of moths belonging to the family Tortricidae.

Species
Polythora viridescens (Meyrick, 1912)

See also
List of Tortricidae genera

References

External links
tortricidae.com

Polyorthini
Tortricidae genera
Taxa named by Józef Razowski